Hailong Market is one of five major electronics markets in Zhongguancun, Beijing.

History
Hailong Market opened in December 1999.

See also
Dinghao Market
Guigu Market
Kemao Market
Taipingyang Market
Zhonghai Market

References

External links
Official site

Economy of Beijing
Tourist attractions in Beijing
Zhongguancun